Jürgen Muschalek (28 September 1951 – July 2003), known as Muscha, was a German artist and film director. He is known for his cult classic film Decoder.

Biography 
Muscha was born in Meinerzhagen, Germany on 28 September 1951. He was a childhood friend of Trini Trimpop, a German rock musician and film director, who directed many projects with him.

He was one of guitarist of the band Charley's Girls and was heavily involved in the punk scene.

He was nominated in 1981, alongside co-director Trini Trimpop, to the Max Ophüls prize for his avant-garde film Humanes Tötem (1980). It was his first feature film.

He eventually moved to Berlin and made his second feature film, Decoder (1984). Many counterculture personalities were involved, including Christiane F, Genesis P-Orridge, FM Einheit, William S. Borroughs, among others. The film was re-released in 2019 by Vinegar Syndrome and it's available to watch in the streaming platform Tubi.

Muscha ended his life in July, 2003.

Filmography

Short films 
 Blitzkrieg-Bop (1977)
 Suicide (1978)
 Mirakel Wip (1979)

Feature films 
 Humanes Töten (Humane killing) (1980)
 Decoder (1984)

References

Further reading 
Klaus Maeck, Walter Hartmann: DECODER-Handbuch – Muzak, Cut-Ups, Piraten, Frogs, Burger, Der Film. TRIKONT Verlag, Duisburg 1984,

External links 
 

1951 births
2003 deaths
German film directors